Klaišiai is a village in the south of Akmenė district,  from Šemetaičiai.

There is a primary school and a medical center. The preserved Klaišiai manor can be found here too, which was originally owned by the Burbos family.

Population

References 

Akmenė District Municipality
Villages in Šiauliai County